The following page lists biggest natural gas pipelines in Lithuania.

First natural gas pipeline in Lithuania was built in 1961 from Ivatsevichy to Vilnius.

References 

 
Pipelines